In mathematics, the Weierstrass M-test is a test for determining whether an infinite series of functions converges uniformly and absolutely. It applies to series whose terms are bounded functions with real or complex values, and is analogous to the comparison test for determining the convergence of series of real or complex numbers. It is named after the German mathematician Karl Weierstrass (1815-1897).

Statement 
Weierstrass M-test. 
Suppose that (fn) is a sequence of real- or complex-valued functions defined on a set A, and that there is a sequence of non-negative numbers (Mn) satisfying the conditions
  for all  and all , and
  converges.
Then the series 

converges absolutely and uniformly on A.

The result is often used in combination with the uniform limit theorem. Together they say that if, in addition to the above conditions, the set A is a topological space and the functions fn are continuous on A, then the series converges to a continuous function.

Proof 

Consider the sequence of functions
 

 
For the chosen ,
 
 
(Inequality (1) follows from the triangle inequality.)

The sequence  is thus a Cauchy sequence in R or C, and by completeness, it converges to some number  that depends on x. For n > N we can write
 
Since N does not depend on x, this means that the sequence  of partial sums converges uniformly to the function S.  Hence, by definition, the series  converges uniformly.

Analogously, one can prove that  converges uniformly.

Generalization 
A more general version of the Weierstrass M-test holds if the common codomain of the functions (fn) is a Banach space, in which case the premise

is to be replaced by

,

where  is the norm on the Banach space. For an example of the use of this test on a Banach space, see the article Fréchet derivative.

See also
 Example of Weierstrass M-test

References 

  
 
 
 

Functional analysis
Convergence tests
Articles containing proofs